Metis (born March 28, 1984 in Hiroshima) is a Japanese female reggae singer songwriter. She debuted in her early as an R&B artist, but after her first single and album, she signed to another record label to pursue a reggae career.

Discography

Indie albums

ANSWER
MUSIC

Mini-albums
WOMAN
BLESS

Albums
ONE LOVE
ONE HEART
ONE SOUL

Singles

 
 "Respect!"

Radio programs
 Validelight no Buchi-vali-night (report from Tokyo) – HIROSHIMA FM

External links
Very Up-to-date Metis Informational BLOG
Metis OFFICIAL WEBSITE
Metis Nippon Crown WEBSITE

Japanese women musicians
Japanese women pop singers
Japanese women singer-songwriters
Japanese singer-songwriters
1984 births
Living people
Musicians from Hiroshima
21st-century Japanese singers
21st-century Japanese women singers